Viterbe is a commune in the Tarn department in southern France.

The closest airport to Viterbe is Toulouse Airport (47 km).

See also
Communes of the Tarn department

References

Communes of Tarn (department)